School District 6 Rocky Mountain is a school district in South Eastern British Columbia. This includes the major centres of Kimberley, Invermere and Golden.

History
School District 6 Rocky Mountain was formed in 1996 by the amalgamation of School District 3 (Kimberley), School District 4 (Windermere) and School District 18 (Golden).

Schools

Trustees

See also
List of school districts in British Columbia

References

Columbia Valley
06